John Dews (26 March 1945 – 7 August 1995) was a British motorcycle speedway rider.

Born in Wakefield, West Yorkshire, England, Dews started his speedway career as a trainee at Belle Vue Aces, had his longest team history with Sheffield Tigers, scoring over 1,300 points for the club. Speedway rules required a change of team due to his averages and he moved to Wimbledon Dons for 2 years, before Oxford in 1973, as a replacement for Dave Hemus, He won the Radio Oxford Best Pairs match at Oxford in May 1974, partnering Richard Greer. He was a member of the Midland Cup winning team in 1975, after  incredible drawn matches with Swindon Robins in the first round requiring reruns.
Moved with the Rebels under promoters Danny Dunton and Robert Dugard to White City Stadium in 1976, where he ended his racing career as a popular rider.

He rode 270 matches in his career, having 1033 rides, with a match average of 6.29. He went back to Sheffield to be the team manager in 1977 until 1980.

John Dews died in August 1995, aged only 50, after a short illness.

References

External links
Sheffieldspeedway.co
Wwosbackup.proboards.com

1945 births
1995 deaths
Sportspeople from Wakefield
English motorcycle racers
Belle Vue Aces riders
Sheffield Tigers riders
Wimbledon Dons riders
Oxford Cheetahs riders
White City Rebels riders
British speedway riders